Nuclear winter is a hypothetical climatic effect of nuclear war.

It may also refer to:
Nuclear Winter, an album by The Lonely Forest
Nuclear Winter Volume 1 (2009) or Nuclear Winter Volume 2: Death Panel (2011), mixtape albums by Sole
Nuclear Wintour, nickname for magazine editor Anna Wintour
Nuclear Winter, a mode of the video game Fallout 76